Robin Harris (born April 13, 1956) is an American former professional tennis player.

A native of La Jolla, Harris briefly played varsity tennis for San Diego City College and was the only female member of the team. She was active on tour in the 1970s, featuring in main draws at the French Open and Wimbledon. 

In 1976 she had an indirect role in the Renée Richards controversy as the player beaten in a tournament final by Richards, who after the match was outed as transgender by a reporter.

References

External links
 
 

1956 births
Living people
American female tennis players
Tennis players from San Diego